The International Football Association Board (IFAB) is the body that determines the Laws of the Game of association football. IFAB was founded in 1886 to agree standardised Laws for international competition, and has since acted as the "guardian" of the internationally used Laws. Since its establishment in 1904, FIFA, the sport's top governing body, has recognised IFAB's jurisdiction over the Laws. IFAB is known to take a highly conservative attitude regarding changes to the Laws of the Game.

It is a separate body from FIFA, though FIFA is represented on the board and holds 50% of the voting power. As a legacy of association football's origins in the United Kingdom, the other organisations represented are the governing bodies of the game in the four nations of the UK. Amendments to the Laws require a three-quarter supermajority vote, meaning that FIFA's support is necessary but not sufficient for a motion to pass.

Operations
IFAB is made up of representatives from each of the United Kingdom's pioneering football associations—England's Football Association (The FA), the Scottish Football Association (SFA), the Football Association of Wales (FAW) and Northern Ireland's Irish Football Association (IFA)—and the Fédération Internationale de Football Association (FIFA, the International Association Football Federation), the international governing body for football. Each British association has one vote and FIFA has four. IFAB deliberations must be approved by three-quarters of the vote, or at least six of the eight votes. Thus, FIFA's approval is necessary for any IFAB decision, but FIFA alone cannot change the Laws of the Game—they need to be agreed by at least two of the UK members. As of 2016, all members must be present for a binding vote to proceed.

The Board meets twice a year, once to decide on possible changes to the rules governing the game of Football (the Annual General Meeting (AGM)) and once to deliberate on its internal affairs (the Annual Business Meeting (ABM)). In FIFA World Cup years, the AGM is held at FIFA's offices; otherwise, it rotates between Northern Ireland, Wales, England and Scotland in that order. Four weeks before the AGM, the member associations must send their written proposals to the secretary of the host association. FIFA then prints a list of suggestions that are distributed to all other associations for examination. The AGM is held either in February or March and the ABM is held between September and October. In cases of necessity, the Board can meet in a Special Meeting in addition to the two ordinary annual meetings. As of December 2012, the last Special Meeting was hosted by FIFA in Zurich on 5 July 2012.

The decisions of each year's Annual General Meeting of the Board regarding changes to the Laws of the Game enter into force from 1 July (and are binding on FIFA and on the other members of the Board, and, given that FIFA's Statutes establish that FIFA and its member associations and affiliates adhere to the Laws of the Game laid down by IFAB, those changes bind also FIFA's other member associations, FIFA's continental confederations of member associations, and the subnational entities of the national associations) but confederations, member associations and other bodies whose current season has not ended by 1 July may delay the introduction of the adopted alterations to the Laws of the Game in their competitions until the beginning of their next season. As well as permanent changes to the Laws, IFAB also authorises trials of potential amendments.

History

Though the rules of football had largely been standardised by the early 1880s, the UK's four football associations still each had slightly different rules. When international matches were played, the rules of the home team's national association were used. While this solution was workable, it was hardly ideal. To remedy this, the then football associations of England, Wales, Scotland and Ireland met at the International Football Conference on 6 December 1882 in Manchester, in order to set forth a common set of rules that could be applied to matches between the UK football associations' national teams.  

In the summer of 1885, the English FA legalised professionalism.  The Scottish FA responded that it would refuse to allow professionals in its own national team, and would refuse to play international matches against an England team containing professionals.  The Irish FA attempted to mediate by proposing that "an international conference should be held each year, say, in August, to be called in turn by each national association to deal with the laws of the game, and discuss other matters of interest to Association football, and at which international disputes could be adjusted".

The first meeting of IFAB took place at the FA's offices at Holborn Viaduct in London on Wednesday 2 June 1886. The FA, SFA, FAW and IFA each had equal voting rights.

Fédération Internationale de Football Association (FIFA), the international organising body for the sport, was formed in Paris in 1904 and declared that, regarding the Laws of the Game itself, they would enforce the rules laid down by IFAB.  In 1912, FIFA requested that its representatives be included in IFAB. At a special meeting held in January 1913 in Wrexham, IFAB agreed to FIFA's request.  The first regular IFAB meeting to include FIFA occurred in June 1913.  Each association (including FIFA) was entitled to send two representatives, with a four-fifths majority required to change the laws (thus the UK associations could still change the laws against FIFA's wishes if they all voted together).  One more meeting of IFAB was held, in Paris in 1914, before regular meetings were curtailed by the First World War.

For the first four post-war IFAB meetings (1920, 1921, 1922, and 1923), FIFA was once again excluded, on account of a dispute between FIFA and the home nations.  From 1924, once the dispute had been resolved, FIFA once again attended IFAB  meetings. In 1958, the Board agreed on its current voting system.

Since Irish partition in 1921, the IFA has evolved to become the organising body for football in Northern Ireland, with football in the Republic of Ireland being organised by the FAI.  A request for the FAI to become a member of IFAB was denied at the 1923 annual general meeting.

List of IFAB Annual General Meetings

References

External links

 
 History of IFAB, including minutes of the meetings Soccer South Bay Referee Association
 FIFA/IFAB paper on the role of the IFAB FIFA

Association football governing bodies
FIFA
Laws of association football
Sports organizations established in 1886
1886 establishments in England